The following lists of patriarchs of Jerusalem are available:

 List of Greek Orthodox patriarchs of Jerusalem
 List of Armenian patriarchs of Jerusalem
 List of Latin patriarchs of Jerusalem

Note: For the Melkite Patriarchs of Antioch, whose full title is Patriarch of Antioch and All the East, of Alexandria and Jerusalem of the Melkite Greek Catholic Church; see List of Melkite Greek Catholic Patriarchs of Antioch.

Patriarchs
Jerusalem-related lists